North Road Cemetery is located in the Adelaide suburb of Nailsworth, approximately 5 km north of the central business district.  It is 7.3 hectares (18 acres) in size and there have been over 26,000 burials since its foundation in 1853.  The original size of the cemetery was 0.8 hectare (2 acres) and was established by South Australia's first Anglican bishop, Augustus Short on land which he owned.  The cemetery is still maintained by the Anglican Diocese of Adelaide.

Notable interments

 Richard Baker, barrister and politician, first President of the Australian Senate
 Daisy Bates, journalist, welfare worker and Protector of Aborigines
 Benjamin Boothby, colonial judge
 Haydn Bunton, Sr., legendary Australian rules footballer
 Henry John Butler, early Australian aviator
 Sir Robert William Chapman, engineer and mathematician
 John Dempster, City Organist
 John Downer, twice Premier of South Australia in the 19th century
 Rev. George Henry Farr, headmaster of St Peter's College, and his wife Julia Farr, social worker
 William Finke, early settler, prospector and pastoralist
 James Collins Hawker, explorer, surveyor and aide de camp to Governor George Gawler
 George Wright Hawkes, Anglican churchman associated with Trinity Church and St Peter's College
 Clem Hill, Australian cricketer
 Stephen King, Australian explorer
 Sir Angas Parsons, politician and judge
 William John Peterswald, Chief Commissioner of Police of the Colony of South Australia (1882-1896)
 Alexander Poynton, former Treasurer and Federal Parliament politician
 Charles Rasp, discoverer of lead deposits at Broken Hill and a founding shareholder of BHP
 Moritz Richard Schomburgk, German-born botanist and director of the Adelaide Botanic Garden
 Alfred Searcy, public servant and writer
 Sir Keith Macpherson Smith, early Australian aviator and flight pioneer
 Sir Ross Macpherson Smith, early Australian aviator and flight pioneer
 Edward Charles Stirling, founder of the University of Adelaide's medical school, Director of South Australian Museum, anthropologist, explorer and the first person in Australasia to introduce a bill for women's suffrage
 Harriet Stirling OBE, joint founder of the School for Mothers and Mareeba Babies' Hospital
 John Lancelot Stirling, Member of Parliament, director of several important SA companies, and introducer of polo to South Australia
 Sir Robert Kyffin Thomas, newspaper proprietor
 Charles Todd, colonial Superintendent of Telegraphs and the Government Astronomer
 Thomas Worsnop, City Treasurer and Town Clerk of the City of Adelaide, historian, fellow of the Royal Historical Society, London.
 Edmund Wright, architect and former Lord Mayor of Adelaide
 John Wrathall Bull, claimed inventor of the Wheat Stripper
The cemetery contains the war graves of over 1,500 Commonwealth service personnel, ranging from WW1 to the Vietnam War.

References

External links
 Historical graves at North Road Cemetery

Cemeteries in South Australia
Anglican cemeteries in Australia
1853 establishments in Australia
South Australian Heritage Register
Burials at North Road Cemetery